Raymond Mungo (born 1946) is an American author, co-author, or editor of more than a dozen books. He writes about business, economics, and financial matters as well as cultural issues. 

In the 1960s, he attended Boston University, where he served as editor of the Boston University News in 1966-67, his senior year; and where, as a student leader, he spearheaded demonstrations against the Vietnam War.

In 1967, Mungo co-founded the Liberation News Service (LNS), an alternative news agency, along with Marshall Bloom.  LNS split off from Collegiate Press Service (CPS) in a political dispute. The founding event was a notably tumultuous meeting that transpired not far from the offices of CPS on Church Street in Washington, D.C. Mungo descriptively details this event in his book, Famous Long Ago: My Life and Hard Times with the Liberation News Service.

In 1968, he moved to Vermont with Verandah Porche and others as part of the back-to-the-land movement.

Mungo continued to write through the 1970s and 1980s; however, in 1997 his career path took a different turn. When he wrote Palm Springs Babylon in 1993 he lived in Palm Springs, California.  He completed a master's degree in counseling and began working with the severely mentally ill and with AIDS patients in Los Angeles.  Mungo visited France in 2000 and briefly considered relocating there.

Published works 

 
 
 
  (Fiction)
 
  Photos by Peter Simon.
  Trilogy containing Famous Long Ago, Total Loss Farm, and Return to Sender in one paperback edition.
  Trilogy of Famous Long Ago, Total Loss Farm, and Return to Sender in one paperback edition.
 
 
 
 
 
 
 
 
 
  Series editor: Martin Duberman.

References

1946 births
Living people
News agency founders
American anti–Vietnam War activists
People from Lawrence, Massachusetts
Boston University alumni
American male writers